Flight 280 may refer to:
American Flyers Flight 280, crashed on 22 April 1966
West Wind Aviation Flight 280, crashed on 13 December 2017

0280